Heinz Kemethmüller (26 June 1914 – 20 February 1984) was a Luftwaffe ace and recipient of the Knight's Cross of the Iron Cross during World War II. The Knight's Cross of the Iron Cross was awarded to recognise extreme battlefield bravery or successful military leadership.

Career
Kemethmüller was born on 26 June 1914 in Nurnberg.

He initially served as a Feldwebel on the Eastern Front with 8./Jagdgeschwader 3 (JG 3—3rd Fighter Wing), and received the Knight's Cross of the Iron Cross on 2 October 1942. He then transferred to Jagdgeschwader 26 (JG 26—26th Fighter Wing), serving with and 7., 9. & 4./JG 26.

On 4 February 1943 Kemethmüller was wounded in combat with Spitfires IXs of No. 331 Squadron RAF, his Focke-Wulf Fw 190 A-4 being badly damaged.

He was shot down and badly wounded on 4 November 1944.

During his career Heinz Kemethmüller flew 463 missions, and was credited with 89 aerial victories, 71 on the Eastern Front (including 20 2-engined bombers and 26 Ilyushin Il-2 Stormovik Soviet ground attack aircraft) He also claimed 18 over the Western Front, including three USAAF heavy bombers and 7 P-47 fighters shot down.

He died 20 February 1984 in Bonn.

Summary of career

Aerial victory claims
According to US historian David T. Zabecki, Kemethmüller was credited with 89 aerial victories. Spick also lists Kemethmüller with 89 aerial victories claimed in 463 combat missions. This figure includes 70 claims on the Eastern Front and 19 over the Western Allies, including three four-engined bombers.

Awards
 Aviator badge
 Front Flying Clasp of the Luftwaffe
 Ehrenpokal der Luftwaffe (31 August 1942)
 Iron Cross (1939)
 2nd Class
 1st Class
 German Cross in Gold on 3 October 1942 as Feldwebel in the 8./Jagdgeschwader 3
 Knight's Cross of the Iron Cross on 2 October 1942 as Feldwebel and pilot in the 8./Jagdgeschwader 3 "Udet"

Notes

References

Citations

Bibliography

External links
TracesOfWar.com

1914 births
1984 deaths
Military personnel from Nuremberg
People from the Kingdom of Bavaria
German World War II flying aces
Luftwaffe pilots
Recipients of the Gold German Cross
Recipients of the Knight's Cross of the Iron Cross